Padel competitions at the 2022 South American Games in Asunción, Paraguay are scheduled to be held between October 8 and 9, 2022 at the Canchas de Pádel.

Schedule
The competition schedule is as follows:

Medal summary

Medal table

Medalists

Participation
Seven nations will participate in padel of the 2022 South American Games.

References

Padel
2022